Ganio is a surname. Notable people with the surname include:

  (born c.1954), French dancer and ballet teacher, ex-étoile of the Ballet de Marseille.  
 Mathieu Ganio (born 1984), French dancer, étoile of the Paris Opera Ballet; the son of Denys Ganio and Dominique Khalfouni.

See also
Gagnot

French-language surnames